Xfile is a file manager developed by Rixstep, built as a Finder replacement for the Mac OS X operating system. Its features are mostly congruent with those accessible by generic Unix systems.

Some examples of the more advanced features are a consequence of the above. Operating only with generic Unix APIs Xfile is capable of dealing with a wide variety of file systems and not limited to the operating system's native HFS+.

The interface of Xfile is navigational in nature, although Xfile windows can be seen as "document" windows and behave as such.

See also 
Comparison of file managers
File manager

External links 
Rixstep — Xfile Microsite
Rixstep — Xfile Test Drive

File managers
Utilities for macOS